Alexandra Castillo (born 14 June 1971) is a Chilean-Canadian actress and dancer. She is sometimes credited as Alex Castillo.

Life and career
Castillo was born in Santiago, Chile as Alexandra Cecilia Castillo-Smith. As a child, her family moved to Toronto, where she was raised. She got her start on stage through dance, having studied both ballet and flamenco from childhood. Through high school and university, she did theatre and commercials. After completing a master's degree in Latin American studies.

As of late 1990s, Castillo appeared in several television series and films. She guest-starred in The Dead Zone, This Is Wonderland, Fringe and Warehouse 13. In 2013, Castillo was cast as series regular on ABC series Lucky 7.

Filmography

References

External links

1971 births
Chilean emigrants to Canada
Chilean film actresses
Canadian people of Chilean descent
Living people
People from Santiago
Actresses from Toronto
21st-century Chilean actresses
20th-century Chilean actresses
Chilean television actresses
21st-century Canadian actresses